Mariano Nicolás Valcárcel (September 10, 1850 – December 1, 1921) was a Peruvian lawyer and politician. He was born in Arequipa, Peru. He served as foreign minister (1882–1883) and minister of the interior (1890–1891) in the Government of Peru. He was Prime Minister of Peru (August 1890 – July 1891). He served in the Chamber of Deputies of Peru and was elected as its president three times (1889, 1891 and 1893).

References

Bibliography
 Basadre, Jorge: Historia de la República del Perú. 1822 - 1933, Octava Edición, corregida y aumentada. Tomo 8. Editada por el Diario "La República" de Lima y la Universidad "Ricardo Palma". Impreso en Santiago de Chile, 1998.
Tauro del Pino, Alberto: Enciclopedia Ilustrada del Perú. Tercera Edición. Tomo 17, VAC-ZUZ. Lima, PEISA, 2001. 

1850 births
1921 deaths
19th-century Peruvian lawyers
People from Arequipa
Presidents of the Chamber of Deputies of Peru
Peruvian Ministers of Interior
Foreign ministers of Peru